The following lists events that happened during 1908 in Chile.

Incumbents
President of Chile: Pedro Montt

Events 
8 January – The General Velásquez football club is founded.

Births
1 March – Eberardo Villalobos (d. 1964)
26 June – Salvador Allende, politician (d. 1973) 
3 July – Héctor Croxatto, Chilean physiologist (d. 2010)  
21 August – Guillermo Arellano (d. 1999)

Deaths 
21 April – Carlos Pezoa Véliz (b. 1908)
16 May – Mariano Casanova

References 

 
Years of the 20th century in Chile
Chile